Astou Ndiaye-Diatta (born 5 November 1973) is a Senegalese former women's basketball player.  She is currently an assistant coach at Utah State University in the United States.

A 1997 cum laude graduate of Southern Nazarene University, she was selected by the Detroit Shock in the Women's National Basketball Association during its 1999 draft in the second round and was the 22nd pick overall.  She spent five seasons with the Shock, before spending the 2004 season with the Indiana Fever, the 2006 season with the Houston Comets, and the 2007 season with the Seattle Storm.

In July 2008, she was named as an assistant coach at Utah State University.

Notes

External links
 WNBA interview with Ndiaye-Diatta
 Utah State University coaching profile
 WNBA player profile

1973 births
Living people
Basketball players at the 2000 Summer Olympics
Centers (basketball)
College women's basketball players in the United States
Detroit Shock players
Houston Comets players
Indiana Fever players
Olympic basketball players of Senegal
Seattle Reign (basketball) players
Seattle Storm players
Senegalese expatriate basketball people in the United States
Senegalese women's basketball players
Southern Nazarene University alumni
Southern Nazarene Crimson Storm women's basketball players
Basketball players from Dakar
Utah State Aggies women's basketball coaches